Melsons Corner is an unincorporated community in El Dorado County, California.

It has alternately been known as Settlers Corner and most recently as Grays Corner. Sitting at a "T" intersection of Mt. Aukum Road (E16) and Fair Play Road, it is one of the gateways into the Fair Play viticultural region. For at least 25 years, a gas station and convenience store has operated there.

References

Unincorporated communities in California
Unincorporated communities in El Dorado County, California